Chopped is an American reality-based cooking television game show series created by Michael Krupat, Dave Noll and Linda Lea. It is hosted by Ted Allen. The series pits four chefs against each other as they compete for a chance to win $10,000. The series debuted in 2009, and episodes air every Tuesday at 8 p.m. ET on Food Network.

A dessert-themed spin-off titled Chopped Sweets premiered on February 3, 2020, with Scott Conant as host.

Format
In each episode, four chefs compete in a three-round contest, where they attempt to incorporate unusual combinations of ingredients into dishes that are later evaluated by a panel of three judges. At the beginning of each round (typically "Appetizer", "Entrée", and "Dessert", but with occasional exceptions), the chefs are each given a basket containing four mystery ingredients and are expected to create dishes that use all of them in some way. Although failing to use an ingredient is not an automatic disqualification, the judges do take such omissions into account when making their decisions. The ingredients are often not commonly prepared together. For example, in the episode "Yucca, Watermelon, Tortillas," the Appetizer ingredients consisted of watermelon, canned sardines, pepper jack cheese, and zucchini. The chefs are given unlimited access to a pantry and refrigerator stocked with a wide variety of other ingredients, and each chef has his/her own stations for preparing and cooking food. The kitchen also includes a variety of specialized tools and equipment for the chefs' use, such as a deep fryer, a blast chiller, and an ice cream machine.

Each round has a time limit, typically 20 minutes for Appetizer, and 30 minutes each for Entrée and Dessert. These limits have been extended on occasion for special-format episodes and for rounds in which one or more mystery ingredients require additional preparation/cooking time. The chefs must cook their dishes and complete four platings (three for the judges and one "beauty plate") before time runs out. Once time has expired, the judges critique the dishes based on presentation, taste and creativity and select one chef to be "chopped" - eliminated from the competition with no winnings. Allen reveals the judges' decision by lifting a cloche on their table to show the eliminated chef's dish, and one judge comments on the reasoning behind the choice. The Appetizer and Entrée rounds are judged independently from one another, while in the Dessert round, the judges consider the chefs' overall performance during the entire competition. The winner receives $10,000, but special competitions and tournaments have featured larger cash prizes.

Production notes
According to host Ted Allen, the show's unaired pilot episode was "...originally a lot more elaborate. It was set in a mansion, the host was a butler (played by Christopher Flockton, narrator of VH1's The Fabulous Life), the butler held a Chihuahua, and when a chef was chopped the losing dish was fed to the Chihuahua." The Food Network found the pilot episode "a little too weird", but decided to keep the general premise of the show in a more straightforward competition format.

An episode of Chopped takes approximately 12 hours to tape, with deliberations after each round taking about 20 minutes. Judging is done by consensus among the judges.

While contestants do not know the ingredients ahead of time, they are given a tour of the kitchen prior to taping. Some preliminary tasks, such as preheating ovens and bringing water to a boil, are done in advance of each round.

Chefs must be 19 years or older to appear on the regular show. Teenagers and children are occasionally invited to compete in special episodes.

Medical personnel are present in the studio to treat any injuries sustained by the chefs and may, at their discretion, disqualify a chef who appears unable to continue safely in the competition.

If the judges consider a dish to be unsafe to eat for any reason, such as contamination by blood or other bodily fluids, they do not taste it but may still evaluate it on presentation and creativity.

Special episodes

Chopped Champions
Starting September 8, 2009, Food Network aired a four-episode Chopped Champions tournament, in which 13 previous winners were invited to face off again. Four chefs competed per episode; the three losing chefs were eliminated from the tournament, while the winner received $10,000 and faced three new competitors in the next episode.

As of February 2020, the network has aired six additional Chopped Champions tournaments, each consisting of four preliminary heats and a finale. Four previous champions compete in each preliminary heat; the winner receives no money, but secures a slot in the finale to compete for a $50,000 grand prize.

Chopped All-Stars
Starting March 6, 2011, and continuing for four additional episodes, Food Network aired the "Chopped All-Stars" Tournament. Sixteen chefs competed. The first four episodes featured four types of chef: The Next Food Network Star contestants, Food Network celebrities, celebrity chefs, and Chopped judges. The winners of those four episodes then competed against each other in the "Grand Finale", where the winner received $50,000 to donate to a charity of his or her choice. Nate Appleman, a celebrity chef, won the competition and donated his $50,000 to Kawasaki Disease research, a disease from which his son suffered.

Starting April 8, 2012, and continuing for four additional episodes, Food Network aired the second "Chopped All-Stars" Tournament. Sixteen new chefs competed, again ranging from four different categories of chef: Iron Chef America chefs (the newest of the four categories), Food Network and Cooking Channel celebrities, The Next Food Network Star contestants, and Chopped judges. Celebrity chef & Chopped judge Marcus Samuelsson won this second competition, donating the $50,000 grand prize to the Careers Through Culinary Arts Program of New York (aka C-CAP), which helps under-served youth through culinary arts education and employment.

On April 7, 2013, the third installment of the "Chopped All-Stars" Tournament premiered on Food Network. Over the course of four episodes, sixteen chefs competed in groups of four. There were four different categories of the chefs through the episodes: Food Network vs. Cooking Channel, Mega Chefs, Chopped Judges, and celebrities, respectively. Winners of each of these rounds went on to compete against each other in the "Grand Finale" episode, where the winner received $50,000 to donate to a charity of his or her choice. Celebrity chef and Chopped judge Scott Conant won this competition, donating $50,000 to the Keep Memory Alive Foundation.

On April 28, 2015, the fourth "All-Stars" Tournament began airing, with an increased grand prize of $75,000 to the winner. As before, they are split into groups of four chefs per episode, with the winner of each of the first four episodes competing in the fifth "Grand Finale" episode for the top prize. Unlike previous tournaments, however, the 16 chefs involved were not split into "categories", but were sorted in what seems to be a more random fashion. The winner was Anne Burrell who was playing for the Juvenile Diabetes Research Foundation.

Chopped Grill Masters
Starting July 22, 2012, and continuing for four additional episodes, Food Network aired the "Chopped Grill Masters" Tournament. Sixteen "pro" grillers competed. The winners of the first four episodes competed against each other in the "Grand Finale" for a $50,000 prize. The "Grill Masters" episodes were taped outdoors at Old Tucson Studios near Tucson, AZ. The winner was Ernest Servantes, Executive Chef at Texas Lutheran University and Pit Boss at Burnt Bean Company.

In the summer of 2015, a second "Grill Masters" Tournament occurred, and was sponsored by Lea & Perrins. Like the previous "Grill Masters" Tournament, it was filmed on location and 16 "pro" grillers competed. The 4 preliminary heat winners advanced to the finals where they would compete for a $50,000 grand prize. The winner was Angie Mar. The second heat of this particular tournament marked the first time that Chopped used a brand name on a basket ingredient, which in this case was the Worcestershire sauce, possibly because the ingredient was a product of tournament sponsor Lea & Perrins.

On July 5, 2016 another 5-part "Grill Masters" Tournament premiered. This tournament was taped at the Beringer Vineyards in Napa Valley, CA, and featured 16 "pro" grillers. In contrast to past tournaments, the 4 finalists each won a guaranteed $10,000 for winning their heat, and the finalists competed to win another $50,000 for a total grand prize of $60,000. The winner of this tournament was Sophina Uong.

Chopped Tournament of Stars
During Season 19, Chopped held a 5-part "Tournament of Stars". It was identical in format to the "All Stars" Tournaments, with 16 celebrities competing to win $50,000 for charity. The contestants were divided into 4 categorical groups for the first four episodes (sports stars, Rachael vs. Guy finalists, comedians, and actors, respectively). Winner Michael Imperioli donated his winnings to the Pure Land Project, an organization that helps build and maintain schools in rural Tibet.

Chopped Ultimate Champions
During Season 21, a 5-part "Ultimate Champions" Tournament was held, featuring 16 returning champions (12 amateurs and 4 professional chefs) competing to win $50,000, plus a new car of the winners choice from Buick. Like most celebrity tournaments, the returning champions were divided into 4 categorical groups for the first four episodes (professionals, amateur champs, heroes, and celebrities, respectively). The winner was Diana Sabater. The finale of this tournament also marked the first time that both civilian and celebrity contestants competed in the same episode.

Chopped: Impossible
In the fall of 2015, Chopped aired a four-part "Chopped: Impossible" Tournament in which 12 former champions were invited back to compete for a grand prize of up to $40,000. Each basket contained ingredient combinations that were specifically chosen to be more difficult than usual. Four chefs competed in each of three preliminary heats, with Restaurant: Impossible host Robert Irvine as one of the three judges. The winners advanced to a two-round finale (Appetizer and Entree), in which Irvine observed their cooking but did not serve as a judge. The winner of the finale received $15,000 and competed directly against Irvine in a "Wild Card Entree" round, receiving an additional $25,000 if his/her dish was judged superior to Irvine's.

Teen Tournaments
Three 5-part Teen Tournaments have been held to date, in seasons 21, 25 and 29, following the same structure as other tournaments. Four teen chefs competed in each preliminary heat, with the winners advancing to the finale. Prizes were awarded in the finale as follows:

 Season 21: $25,000 cash and a $40,000 culinary school scholarship for the winner; $1,000 FoodNetwork.com gift certificate for each of the other finalists
 Seasons 25 and 29: $25,000 cash for the winner; $1,000 FoodNetwork.com gift certificate and a show-branded chef's jacket for each of the other finalists

Chopped After Hours

Chopped After Hours is a spin-off series that premiered on September 15, 2015 and airs at 11 p.m. ET on Tuesdays. Episodes consist of three segments, each featuring judges from a different Chopped episode as they prepare dishes using one of the mystery ingredient baskets given to the original contestants. The second season premiered on July 5, 2016.

Chopped Star Power
In season 33, Chopped will be holding a tournament consisting of 16 celebrities divided into four categories: internet celebrities, athletes, comedians, and TV and film stars, with a grand prize of $50,000 for charity. The event began on March 28, 2017.

Chopped: Sweets Showdown
On September 5, 2019, it was announced that a five-episode stunt titled Chopped: Sweets Showdown will premiere on October 1, 2019.

Chopped: Beat the Judge
On April 7, 2020, the 47th season premiered with a series of episodes titled Chopped: Beat the Judge. Three champions from previous episodes compete through the Appetizer and Entrée rounds. Allen then announces the format for the third round, in which the remaining chef competes against a Chopped judge for the $10,000 prize.

Chopped: Desperately Seeking Sous-Chef
On May 31, 2022, 16 chefs competed in a five-episode tournament judged by Maneet Chauhan, Scott Conant, and Chris Santos. The winners of four preliminary heats advanced to the finale, in which the winner became a sous-chef at a restaurant owned by the judge of his/her choice.

Other special episodes
Chopped Amateurs features contestants who do not have professional training or schooling; most are self-taught.

Celebrity episodes: four celebrities competing for charity. Some episodes have featured teens or children competing. Occasionally the prize is a scholarship to a culinary school. Losing contestants on these episodes often receive a consolation prize, typically a $1,000 shopping spree on foodnetwork.com. On one occurrence the prize was a $40,000 scholarship, the runner-up received a $20,000 scholarship while the other two contestants each received a $5,000 scholarship.
Holiday themed episodes have also occurred featuring holiday inspired ingredients (such as a chocolate Santa on a Christmas episode or candy blood on a Halloween show) and the contestants are asked to prepare holiday themed dishes. There were also several themed episodes with non-holiday themes. These themes were based on either themed ingredients (e.g. spicy foods), world cuisines (e.g. Italian, Australian, New Orleans), chefs with the same background (notably, redemption episodes featuring former contestants that got "chopped" in their first appearances), or a combination.

Judges

Regular judges
The following judges have appeared in four or more seasons:

Guest judges
The following judges have appeared in three or fewer seasons:

Episodes

Former contestants competing in other reality shows
Some of the contestants on Chopped would go on to appear in Fox's reality show Hell's Kitchen. William Lustberg, the runner up on the ninth episode of the first season, was the runner up on season 9 of Hell's Kitchen. Roshni Mansukhani, the winner of the fourth episode of the second season, was eliminated in the eighth episode of the tenth season of Hell's Kitchen. Jackie Baldassari, who was eliminated after the entrée in the tenth episode of the ninth season of Chopped, was eliminated in the ninth episode of the eleventh season of Hell's Kitchen. Anthony "Anton" Testino, who was eliminated after the appetizer in the tenth episode of the fifth season, was eliminated in the fourteenth episode of the twelfth season of Hell's Kitchen. Robyn Almodovar, the winner of the sixth episode of the twenty-fourth season, had previously been eliminated in the sixteenth episode of the tenth season of Hell's Kitchen and was later eliminated in thirteenth episode of the seventeenth season of Hell's Kitchen. Finally, Hassan Musselmani, who was eliminated after the dessert in the third episode of the 35th season of Chopped, had previously been eliminated in the seventh episode of the fifteenth season of Hell's Kitchen. In addition, Frank Bilotti, who was eliminated after the entrée in the third episode of the 37th season, had previously been eliminated in the tenth episode of the thirteenth season of Hell's Kitchen. Some former contestants and judges from Chopped have also appeared on Beat Bobby Flay, as well as several former contestants appearing on another Food Network series Cutthroat Kitchen.

Awards
Chopped won two James Beard Awards in 2012 from the James Beard Foundation: one medal for Best Show, In-Studio or Fixed Location, given to Ted Allen, the team of judges, Food Network, and producers Linda Lea, Dave Noll, and Vivian Sorenson; the other for Media Personality or Host, given to Allen. Also, "Chopped" was inducted into the Culinary Hall of Fame in 2012.

Chopped Sweets
A spin-off series titled Chopped Sweets premiered on February 3, 2020, with Scott Conant as host. It follows the same three-round competition/judging structure and $10,000 prize as the original, with chefs required to make desserts in every round that adhere to a theme announced by Conant. The judging panel consists of Conant and two other judges, and the time limit is typically extended from 30 minutes to 45 to allow proper time for baking.

Episode list

International adaptations

Chopped Canada
Beginning on January 2, 2014, Food Network also aired a Canadian version of Chopped called Chopped Canada, which features Canadian contestants and judges. That adaptation was originally hosted by Canadian-born actor Dean McDermott for the first two seasons, and was then hosted by former CFL wide receiver Brad Smith. The rules are identical to the U.S. counterpart as is the $10,000 prize. The show was cancelled on February 11, 2017, after four seasons.

Chopped South Africa
Beginning July 23, 2014, Food Network South Africa began airing a local adaptation of Chopped called Chopped South Africa.

Chopped تحدي الطبخ
Beginning June 27, 2021, Dubai TV began airing a local adaptation of Chopped called Chopped تحدي الطبخ.

See also
 Sweet Genius
 Cupcake Wars
 Chopped: Canada
 Chopped Junior

Notes

References

External links
 
 

2009 American television series debuts
2000s American cooking television series
2010s American cooking television series
2020s American cooking television series
English-language television shows
Food Network original programming
Food reality television series
Reality competition television series
Cooking competitions in the United States